The list of shipwrecks in 1947 includes ships sunk, foundered, grounded, or otherwise lost during 1947.

January

1 January

2 January

3 January

5 January

7 January

8 January

11 January

12 January

13 January

14 January

18 January

19 January

20 January

21 January

23 January

25 January

26 January

29 January

30 January

February

2 February

5 February

8 February

18 February

26 February

March

3 March

4 March

6 March

8 March

9 March

12 March

13 March

19 March

21 March

22 March

24 March

28 March

30 March

Unknown date

April

1 April

3 April

4 April

13 April

14 April

15 April

16 April

23 April

28 April

29 April

30 April

Unknown date

May

2 May

8 May

11 May

13 May

14 May

17 May

22 May

24 May

25 May

31 May

June

4 June

6 June

14 June

21 June

22 June

28 June

Unknown date

July

1 July

3 July

4 July

11 July

13 July

17 July

18 July

19 July

21 July

22 July

23 July

28 July

31 July

Unknown date

August

1 August

8 August

9 August

11 August

16 August

18 August

20 August

21 August

25 August

Unknown date

September

3 September

6 September

8 September

9 September

13 September

15 September

16 September

29 September

October

2 October

4 October

6 October

7 October

11 October

15 October

16 October

18 October

19 October

21 October

30 October

31 October

November

1 November

2 November

3 November

6 November

11 November

20 November

21 November

22 November

24 November

28 November

30 November

December

1 December

9 December

12 December

18 December

20 December

24 December

26 December

31 December

Unknown date

See also 
 Lists of shipwrecks

References

Shipwrecks
 
1947